Esmail Aqa Mahalleh (also Romanized as Esmā‘īl Āqā Maḩalleh) is a village in Qareh Toghan Rural District, in the Central District of Neka County, Mazandaran Province, Iran. At the 2006 census, its population was 631, in 157 families.

References 

Populated places in Neka County